Minnesota State Highway 13 (MN 13) is a  highway in Minnesota that runs from its intersection with U.S. Highway 65 in Albert Lea to its northern terminus at its intersection with State Highway 149 at the West St. Paul / Saint Paul city boundary line.

Route description

State Highway 13 serves as a north–south route between Albert Lea, Waseca, Prior Lake, Savage, Burnsville, Eagan, Mendota Heights, West St. Paul, and the "West Side" neighborhood of Saint Paul.

The southern terminus of the route is at the intersection of Main Street and Broadway Avenue (U.S. 65 / Business Loop 35) in the city of Albert Lea.

The northern terminus of Highway 13 is at the intersection of Annapolis Street and Smith Avenue (Highway 149) at the West St. Paul / Saint Paul city boundary line.

Highway 13 is built as a divided highway between Savage, Burnsville, and Eagan. This portion of the route is a busy metro area corridor paralleling the Minnesota River.

At the junction with CSAH 101 in Savage, leading to US 169, Highway 13 turns east. This junction is a hybrid: traffic moving from CSAH 101 toward Highway 13 is grade separated, with through traffic connecting to Highway 13 north, and with exit and entrance ramps connecting to Highway 13 south; southbound traffic on Highway 13 uses a continuous green T-intersection, while through traffic connects to CSAH 101.

Highway 13 is also built as a divided highway in Mendota Heights between I-494 (no interchange / junction) to State Highway 55.  The section of Highway 13 north of State Highway 55 at Mendota is far less busy.

Highway 13 is also known as Sibley Memorial Highway in Lilydale, Mendota, and Eagan.

The Sibley House Historic Site museum in Mendota, overlooking Fort Snelling, is located immediately north of the junction of Highways 13 and 62.  The museum is on Highway 13.

Highway 13 is also known as Langford Avenue in Spring Lake Township and Cedar Lake Township in Scott County.

The route follows Main Street and 4th Avenue SW in New Prague.  Highway 13 follows 4th Street in Montgomery.

In the city of Waseca, Highway 13 is also known as State Street.

The 200MW (with possible expansion to 400MW) Bent Tree Wind Farm was scheduled to be built in 2009 along Highway 13 between Manchester and Hartland.  The farm being developed by Wind Capital and Alliant Energy would be the biggest wind farm in the state of Minnesota.

History
State Highway 13 was authorized in 1920 from Albert Lea to Jordan. In 1934, the segment between New Prague and Jordan was redesignated Highway 21, and Highway 13 moved to the east and extended north through Prior Lake, Savage, and Burnsville; then northeast to its northern terminus in West Saint Paul.

From 1934 to 1935, Highway 13 also ran from Albert Lea south to the Iowa state line.  In 1935, U.S. Highway 69 was extended north into Minnesota, assuming that 12 mile section of the route.

The route was completely paved by 1940.

In the late 1960s, U.S. Highway 16 was decommissioned in the Albert Lea area. Highway 13 was then extended east on Main Street in Albert Lea between its intersection with U.S. 69 to its intersection with U.S. 65. Later, US 69 was truncated to the present terminus, and MN 13 was extended along US 69's route.

In 1994, the nearby Mendota Bridge was rebuilt between Mendota Heights and Fort Snelling. Highway 13 was rerouted in Mendota Heights at this time so it could intersect with State Highway 55 and State Highway 110 (present day State Highway 62).  The old alignment of Highway 13 in the southwest corner of Mendota Heights (Sibley Memorial Drive) is still under state maintenance and has the unmarked designation of Highway 913-A.

Major intersections

References

External links

013
Transportation in Dakota County, Minnesota
Transportation in Scott County, Minnesota
Transportation in Le Sueur County, Minnesota
Transportation in Waseca County, Minnesota
Transportation in Freeborn County, Minnesota
U.S. Route 16
U.S. Route 69
Transportation in Rice County, Minnesota
Transportation in Ramsey County, Minnesota